Peren District is a district of Nagaland, India. With headquarters the town of Peren, the district was formed by the partition of Kohima District in 2003.

History 

The Peren district was originally a sub-division of the Kohima district. It was declared a separate district on 24 October 2003.

Administration 

Peren district is divided into 3 subdivisions and 7 blocks. 

Subdivisions
 Jalukie subdivision
 Peren subdivision
 Tening subdivision
 
Circle Blocks
 Jalukie 
 Ngwalwa
 Athibung
 Peren
 Tening
 Kebai-Khelma
 Nsong

Demographics
According to the 2011 census, Peren district has a population of 95,219, roughly equal to the nation of Seychelles.  This gives it a ranking of 616th in India (out of a total of 640). Peren has a sex ratio of 917 females for every 1000 males, and a literacy rate of 79%.

Religion 

According to the 2011 official census, Christianity is major religion in Peren District with 86.145 Christians (90.47%), 4.076 Hindus (4.28%), 2.493 Animists (2.62%), 1.850 Muslims (1.94%), 459 Buddhists (0.48%), 15 Sikhs (0.02%), 10 Jains (0.01%) and 171 did not answer (0.18%).

Languages 
At the time of the 2011 census, 57.20% of the population spoke Zeilang, 11.37% Zemi, 10.15% Kuki, 3.95% Kabui, 3.84% Liangmai, 2.54% Nepali, 1.94% Bengali, 1.67% Chakeshang and 1.08% Ao as their first language.

Flora and fauna

References

External links 
 Official site

 
Districts of Nagaland
2003 establishments in Nagaland